Shahnaz Husain is the founder, chairperson & managing director of The Shahnaz Husain Group in India. She has received international acclaim for pioneering the Herbal beauty care movement and taking the Indian herbal heritage of Ayurveda worldwide. In 2006, she was awarded the Padma Shri, the fourth highest civilian award, by the Government of India for her contribution to the fields of trade and industry.

She was invited by Harvard Business School to speak on her success story of establishing an international brand without commercial advertising and has also become a Harvard Case Study which is included in its curriculum. She has also lectured to students at Massachusetts Institute of Technology (MIT), University of Oxford and  London School of Economics. Shahnaz has also represented India at President  Barack Obama’s World Summit for Entrepreneurs. In 1996, she won Success Magazine's "World's Greatest Woman Entrepreneur" award. She has walked the red carpet at the Cannes Film Festival and has spoken at both the House of Lords and House of Commons in the British Parliament.

Personal life 
Born Shahnaz Beg, she is the daughter of Justice Nasir Ullah Beg, a former Chief Justice of the Allahabad High Court and Sayeeda Begum, who was the daughter of the commander-in-chief of the Hyderabad army. Her grandfather, Justice Samiullah Beg, was a prominent politician of the United Province who later served as Chief Justice of the Hyderabad High Court. Her uncle, Mirza Hameedullah Beg, was a former Chief Justice of India.

Shahnaz studied at St. Mary's Convent Inter College, Prayagraj. She was married at an early age to Nasir Husain with whom she has two children. She studied Ayurveda in Iran while Nasir Husain was posted in Tehran. She then completed her training in cosmetic therapy and cosmetology from leading institutions of the West, such as Helena Rubinstein, Schwarzkopf, Christine Valmy, Lancome and Lean of Copenhagen. She returned to India and started Women's World in New Delhi at her home. The then Prime Minister of India, Indira Gandhi, frequently visited her.

Nasir died in 1999 of cardiac arrest. Their son, Sameer Husain who was a rapper allegedly committed suicide in Patna in 2008 and their daughter Nelofar Currimbhoy is taking her legacy forward. Nelofar is also the author of Shahnaz Husain's biography "Flame".

About The Shahnaz Husain Group

Adopting the concept of Herbal Care and Cure, Shahnaz opened her first herbal clinic in 1971 and over the next few years formed The Shahnaz Husain Group. She formulated therapeutic products for specific skin and hair problems, as well as premium ranges for skin care, such as 24 Carat Gold, Oxygen, Diamond, Pearl, Plant Stem Cells and Platinum Range. The company also sells its products online at http://shahnaz.in. The Shahnaz Husain Group has over 400 franchise ventures across the world covering over 138 'without animal testing' countries. The first franchise clinic opened in Calcutta in 1979. Within a year, there were 80 Shahnaz Herbal franchise clinics in India. The first foreign Shahnaz Herbal franchise clinic was opened in London in 1982. The group also operates its premium Ayurveda Salon and Spa treatment center in New Delhi to offer a line of proprietary treatments for Skin, Hair and Body.

Corporate social responsibility 
Shahnaz has tied up with Government skill development projects in beauty and wellness. Her beauty academy has trained and certified over 40,000 under-privileged women, distributing tool kits for home-based business

Awards 

Shahnaz Husain has received several international and national awards for her contribution in the beauty industry:

Publications / further reading

1. Shahnaz Husain Beauty Book (https://www.amazon.in/Shahnaz-Husains-Beauty-Book-Husain/dp/8122200605)

2. Flame Book (http://www.thehindu.com/features/magazine/my-mothers-story/article3359825.ece)

References

External links
 Shahnaz Husain Official Online Store (https://www.shahnaz.in)   
 Shahnaz Husain’s Beauty Blog (https://www.shahnaz.in/index.php/beauty_blog)

Indian businesspeople in the pharmaceutical industry
Recipients of the Padma Shri in trade and industry
Living people
La Martinière College, Lucknow alumni
Businesswomen from Uttar Pradesh
Businesspeople from Lucknow
20th-century Indian businesswomen
20th-century Indian businesspeople
21st-century Indian businesswomen
21st-century Indian businesspeople
1931 births